The war for Spanish reestablishment in Santo Domingo, better known as the Reconquista, was fought between November 7, 1808, and July 9, 1809. In 1808, following Napoleon's invasion of Spain, the criollos of Santo Domingo revolted against French rule and their struggle culminated in 1809 with a return to the Spanish colonial rule for a period commonly termed España Boba.

Battle of Palo Hincado

The first battle took place in Palo Hincado on November 7, 1808, when Gen. Juan Sánchez Ramírez, leading an army of local and Puerto Rican soldiers, attacked by surprise a garrison of the French Army under the command of Governor Marie-Louis Ferrand, who committed suicide later after. Gen. Joseph-David de Barquier heard the news and garrisoned 2000 soldiers in Santo Domingo.

Battle for Santo Domingo
The Siege of Santo Domingo of 1808 was the second and final major battle and was fought between November 7, 1808, and July 11, 1809, at Santo Domingo, Colony of Santo Domingo. A force of Dominican and Puerto-Rican of 1850 troops led by Gen. Juan Sánchez Ramírez, with a naval blockade by British Commander Hugh Lyle Carmichael, besieged and captured the city of Santo Domingo after an 8 months siege of the 2000 troops of the French Army led by Gen. Barquier.

British involvement
British Major General Hugh Lyle Carmichael departed Jamaica with the 2nd West Indian, 54th, 55th, and Royal Irish regiments to aid Britain's new found Spanish allies in reducing the isolated French garrison besieged in south-eastern Hispaniola. Carmichael disembarked at Palenque ( west of Santo Domingo) on 28 June, hastening ahead of his army to confer with his Spanish counterpart— General Juan Sánchez Ramírez, commander of a Puerto Rican regiment and numerous local guerrillas—who for the past eight months had been investing the 1,200-man French garrison commanded by Brig. Gen. Joseph-David de Barquier.

The demoralized French defenders had already requested an armistice and been rebuffed, repeating the suggestion on 1 July as the first British troops arrived overland (hampered by torrential rains). As negotiations progressed Carmichael maintained pressure by installing heavy siege batteries around the city and massing his forces for an assault.

French surrender
On 6 July the capitulation was finalized, de Barquier pointedly surrendering to the British rather than to the Spaniards. The next day British troops occupied the city and Fort San Jerónimo, the French defenders being transported directly to Port Royal, Jamaica without loss of life on either side.

References

 Delafosse, Lemonier; "Second Campaign of Santo Domingo — Dominican-French War of 1808" (translation of C. Armando Rodriguez); Editorial El Diario, Santiago (DR); 1946.
 Guillermin, Gilbert; "Journal History of the Spanish revolution of Santo Domingo" (translation C. Armando Rodriguez); Dominican Academy of History; Imp editing PV Lafourcade, Philadelphia, U.S.; 1810.
 Sánchez Ramírez, Juan; " Journal of the Reconquista"; Editor Montalvo, Santo Domingo (R.D.); 1957.

Bibliography
 Marley, David. Wars of the Americas: A Chronology of Armed Conflict in the New World, 1492 to the PresentABC-CLIO (1998). 

 
History of the Colony of Santo Domingo
Conflicts in 1808
Conflicts in 1809
1800s in the Spanish West Indies
19th century in the Caribbean
19th century in the Dominican Republic
Battles of the Napoleonic Wars
History of New Spain
History of the Dominican Republic
Wars involving France
Wars involving Great Britain
Wars involving Spain
Wars involving the Dominican Republic
1800s in the Caribbean
1800s in New Spain
1800s in the Spanish Empire
Military history of the Dominican Republic
Spanish West Indies